Israel Eliab (born 16 January 1991) is a Papua New Guinea professional rugby league footballer who played for the PNG Hunters in the Queensland Cup. A Papua New Guinea international, most notably at the 2013 World Cup. 

Eliab previously played for the London Broncos in the Championship.

Background
Eliab was born and raised in the small town of Kokopo in the East New Britain Province of Papua New Guinea. He comes from a mixed parentage of East New Britain and Manus.

Playing career
He started off playing in the domestic competition (Digicel Cup) in PNG for the Rabaul Gurias. Israel previously played for the Port Moresby Vipers with whom he won a premiership title in 2013. He then played for the Papua New Guinea Hunters in the Queensland Intrust Super Cup competition, for which he is also the captain. His position is at five-eighth, but has also played at halfback and centre as well.

Eliab captained PNG's rugby league nines side at the 2015 Pacific Games. He captained the 13-aside team in the 2015 Melanesian Cup.

Eliab spent the 2016 season with the London Broncos in the Championship. He has also spent part of 2016 on loan at the London Skolars.

References

External links

PNG Hunters' Israel Eliab listed in list of top 10 QLD Super Cup players

1991 births
Living people
London Broncos players
London Skolars players
Papua New Guinea Hunters players
Papua New Guinea national rugby league team captains
Papua New Guinea national rugby league team players
Papua New Guinean rugby league players
Papua New Guinean sportsmen
Expatriate sportspeople in England
People from East New Britain Province
Port Moresby Vipers players
Rabaul Gurias players
Rugby league halfbacks